Psychic Love Damage is an abandoned album by the American psychedelic rock band Black Moth Super Rainbow, released in 2012. It was originally started as the band's fifth album until front man Tobacco felt unsatisfied with the results and decided to scrap the album and go in a different direction that led to the creation of Cobra Juicy. He wrote on the band's Facebook page, "in 2011 i made a bmsr record called Psychic Love Damage..., but it wasn't very exciting. and not good enough in my opinion for you to spend your $ on. so i junked it for its best moments and made an album that i'm really in love with." The Psychic Love Damage EP is made up of tracks not redone for Cobra Juicy and was released in vinyl form for the Cobra Juicy kickstarter.

Track listing
 "Sunburn Fudge" - 4:08
 "The Wettest Day" - 2:33
 "Citrus Flavored Eyes" - 1:16
 "Quiver the Good Times" - 2:33
 "Weird Winds" - 2:15

References

Black Moth Super Rainbow albums